Niland (formerly  Old Beach, Imperial Junction, and Hobgood) is a census-designated place (CDP) in Imperial County, California, United States. The population was 1,006 at the 2010 census, down from 1,143 in 2000. The 2020 census reported Niland's population at 756. By June 2020, however, after a major fire, the estimated population had diminished to 500. It is part of the El Centro, California Metropolitan Statistical Area.

History
The Old Beach post office operated from 1905 to 1907. The Imperial Junction post office opened in 1910, changed its name to Hobgood in 1913, and to Niland in 1914. The name Hobgood honors pioneer Richard H. Hobgood. The name Niland was coined by the Imperial Farm Lands Association from "Nile Land", a commendatory name for the supposed fertility of the place.

From 1904 to 1960, Niland was the northern terminus of the Inter-California Railway.

The community
A visitor to Niland in 2018 found "quirky decorations, graffiti, and some questionable structural integrity" but also "establishments like motels, RV parks, laundromats, and a diner".

Government and Utilities
The Niland County Service area, operated by the Imperial County Department of Public Works, provides street lighting to Niland.

Niland is served by  Golden State Water Company's Calipatria system.

Demographics

2000
As of the census of 2000, there were 1,143 people, 422 households, and 281 families residing in the CDP. The racial makeup of the CDP was 54.8% White, 3.2% Black or African American, 2.0% Native American, 4.6% Asian, 28.1% from other races, and 7.4% from two or more races.  55.3% of the population were Hispanic or Latino of any race.

There were 422 households, out of which 33.6% had children under the age of 18 living with them, 39.3% were married couples living together, 18.2% had a female householder with no husband present, and 33.4% were non-families. 29.1% of all households were made up of individuals, and 14.7% had someone living alone who was 65 years of age or older.  The average household size was 2.7 and the average family size was 3.3.

In the CDP, the population was spread out, with 30.0% under the age of 18, 8.0% from 18 to 24, 24.0% from 25 to 44, 22.4% from 45 to 64, and 15.6% who were 65 years of age or older.  The median age was 36 years. For every 100 females, there were 100.2 males.  For every 100 females age 18 and over, there were 105.7 males.

The median income for a household in the CDP was $25,592, and the median income for a family was $27,500. Males had a median income of $36,786 versus $26,250 for females. The per capita income for the CDP was $11,297.  About 15.1% of families and 21.4% of the population were below the poverty line, including 19.8% of those under age 18 and 12.4% of those age 65 or over.

2010
The 2010 United States Census reported that Niland had a population of 1,006. The racial makeup of Niland was 539 (53.6%) White, 36 (3.6%) African American, 20 (2.0%) Native American, 36 (3.6%) Asian, 0 (0.0%) Pacific Islander, 315 (31.3%) from other races, and 60 (6.0%) from two or more races. There were 618 Hispanic or Latino residents, of any race (61.4%).

The Census reported that 1,006 people (100% of the population) lived in households, 0 (0%) lived in non-institutionalized group quarters, and 0 (0%) were institutionalized.

There were 367 households, out of which 131 (35.7%) had children under the age of 18 living in them, 143 (39.0%) were opposite-sex married couples living together, 83 (22.6%) had a female householder with no husband present, 30 (8.2%) had a male householder with no wife present.  There were 25 (6.8%) unmarried opposite-sex partnerships, and 5 (1.4%) same-sex married couples or partnerships. 99 households (27.0%) were made up of individuals, and 49 (13.4%) had someone living alone who was 65 years of age or older. The average household size was 2.74.  There were 256 families (69.8% of all households); the average family size was 3.27.

The population dispersal was 248 people (24.7%) under the age of 18, 99 people (9.8%) aged 18 to 24, 215 people (21.4%) aged 25 to 44, 284 people (28.2%) aged 45 to 64, and 160 people (15.9%) who were 65 years of age or older.  The median age was 39.6 years. For every 100 females, there were 96.9 males.  For every 100 females age 18 and over, there were 94.4 males.

The homeowner vacancy rate was 7.4%; the rental vacancy rate was 23.3%.  497 people (49.4% of the population) lived in owner-occupied housing units and 509 people (50.6%) lived in rental housing units.

2020

In the 2020 US Census the community's community's population was reported as 756.

Politics

Climate
This area has a large amount of sunshine year round due to its stable descending air and high pressure.  According to the Köppen climate classification system, Niland has a hot desert climate, BWh on climate maps.

See also
 Niland Geyser
 El Centro Metropolitan Area
 San Diego–Imperial, California
 Slab City, a camp near Niland in the Colorado Desert in southeastern California, used by recreational vehicle owners and squatters from across North America

References

Census-designated places in Imperial County, California
El Centro metropolitan area
Imperial Valley
Populated places in the Colorado Desert
Census-designated places in California